Luke Coulson (born 6 March 1994) is an English footballer who plays as a winger. He is currently a player at Dartford

Career
Coulson was in the academy at Manchester City for ten years while attending school at The Sutton Academy, before enrolling as a student at the University of Michigan, playing for the Michigan Wolverines team. He left after a month reportedly to sign for an English Premier League club – he played a reserve game for Stoke City in October 2012 – before signing for Cardiff City of the Championship in November 2012.

He made his debut for Cardiff as a substitute in an FA Cup defeat against Macclesfield Town on 5 January 2013. His contract was extended to the end of the 2013–14 season. Despite making no further first-team appearances, he was offered a new deal to keep him at the club beyond 2013–14, but rejected the offer to find first-team football elsewhere.

Later that year Coulson had trials at Hibernian and Ipswich Town before signing for Oxford City in January 2015. His performances attracted the attention of professional clubs, going on trial at Crewe Alexandra in October 2015, before joining Eastleigh in January 2016 – a new record signing for the Spitfires. Coulson was called up to the England C squad in October 2016, but turned down the call up so he could play in Eastleigh's televised FA Cup first round tie against Swindon Town, a tie which the Spitfires won after a replay.

After six goals in the first half of the 2016–17 season, Coulson joined Barnet in January 2017 for a club record sale fee – this time a record sale for Eastleigh.

He made his Football League debut for the Bees as a substitute against Newport County on 21 January 2017.

After only 11 appearances, Coulson joined Ebbsfleet United for an undisclosed fee on 13 July 2017. On his competitive debut for Ebbsfleet, Coulson assisted both goals in a 2–2 draw with Guiseley. In the following game he opened the scoring in a 2–0 win against Maidstone United.

Coulson joined Bromley in December 2018.

On 28 June 2022, it was announced that Coulson was leaving Bromley after three–and–a–half seasons at the club.

On 15 July 2022, Coulsdon joined Dartford.

Personal life
Coulson has a degree in sports writing and broadcasting from Staffordshire University.

Coulson's brother Sam (born 1995) was also in the academy at Manchester City before joining Stoke City. He retired in May 2015 due to a recurring knee injury.

Career statistics

Honours
Bromley
FA Trophy: 2021–22
Individual

 Bromley Player of the Year: 2019–20

References

External links

1994 births
Living people
Alumni of Staffordshire University
Association football midfielders
Barnet F.C. players
Bromley F.C. players
Cardiff City F.C. players
Eastleigh F.C. players
Ebbsfleet United F.C. players
Dartford F.C. players
English expatriate footballers
English expatriate sportspeople in the United States
English Football League players
English footballers
Expatriate soccer players in the United States
Footballers from St Helens, Merseyside
Manchester City F.C. players
Michigan Wolverines men's soccer players
National League (English football) players
Oxford City F.C. players